Carl Tart (born January 5, 1989) is an American actor, writer, and comedian. Tart is best known for being a featured player on the 2016 Fox sketch show Party Over Here, a writer on Mad TV, and a regular guest on the podcast Comedy Bang! Bang! He currently stars on the NBC sitcom Grand Crew.

Life and career 
Carl Tart was born in Mississippi and was raised in Los Angeles. He is a regular performer at the Upright Citizens Brigade Theater and an alumnus of the comedy group Boom Chicago.

Tart is a frequent guest on the Earwolf podcast Comedy Bang! Bang! and has also appeared on the podcasts Spontaneanation, Yo, Is This Racist?, Hollywood Handbook, and more.

Filmography

References

External links 

Living people
21st-century American male actors
American male television actors
African-American screenwriters
21st-century African-American people
Year of birth missing (living people)